La Faurie is a commune in the Hautes-Alpes department in southeastern France.

Geography

Climate
La Faurie has a warm-summer mediterranean climate (Köppen climate classification Csb).

Population

See also
Communes of the Hautes-Alpes department

References

Communes of Hautes-Alpes